We Heart It is an image-based social network. We Heart It describes itself as "A home for your inspiration" and a place to "Organize and share the things you love." Users can collect (or "heart") their favorite images to share with friends and organize into collections. Users can access the site through a web browser or We Heart It's iOS and Android mobile apps.

History 

We Heart It was founded in 2008 by Fabio Giolito, a native of Brazil. He started the site as a side project around the idea of "hearting" photos and saving them for sharing with friends. What started as a tool for himself and friends, the product grew organically from there.  When growth began to surge, Fabio brought on co-founder Bruno Zanchet to help focus on infrastructure. The two took on some seed funding and the site became an incorporated business in California in 2011.

Business 
We Heart It was incorporated in the United States in 2011. Its headquarters are located in San Francisco and has a team of 25 employees.

As of June 2013, We Heart It raised $8 million in Series A funding from White Oak and IDG Ventures.

As of February 2014, We Heart It ranks 754 in Alexa's global traffic rank.

In May 2014, We Heart It rolled out mobile advertising in the app.

As of January 2016, We Heart It announced a video content partnership with Popular TV.

As of June 2016, We Heart It formed a strategic partnership with influencer marketing company The Blu Market, led by co-CEOs Steven Forkosh and Jonas Brothers singer Kevin Jonas, in hopes of attracting more users and advertisers.

We Heart It is no longer incorporated in the United States.  It is now owned by Super Basic, LLC.  It no longer has an office or any employees in San Francisco.

Features 
We Heart It is a visual platform that supports still images, animated GIFs, and video.

It offers follow icons, live widgets, and share buttons for users who want to incorporate We Heart It on their website or blog.

We Heart It is known for its positive community, since there are no features for commenting, users feel more comfortable posting content since it will not receive negative comments as it might on other social networks.

In December 2015, the companion app Easel was released. With Easel, users can create custom images with quotes, filters, and colors to share on We Heart It or other social media apps.

Since 2015, Weheartit has launched a Heartist program to award its top users. These 'Heartists' are leaders in creativity and are known to inspire other members of the community. These people are a selection of the most engaged WHI users every year, and Weheartit awards them with a pink star badge that shows on people's profile pictures.

In late August 2017, the feature Articles was released on the site to even further its users' creativity. With this function, the community is now able to share poems, recipes, opinions, creative thoughts and ideas, advice; anything you are able to write down. A while later, “Reactions” were added to the site where you could react to the articles with 5 different options. If you did not want to heart an article, you had the choice to react to it still, while it not having to appear in your canvas. In 2018, reactions for images were added as well.

Usage 
In December 2013, We Heart It reached 25 million monthly users. Four out of five of the site's over 25 million users are under 24 years old, and more than 70 percent are female.  We Heart It has an average user age of 19.

On average, We Heart It members spend more than 16.5 minutes on the site at a time. The average mobile app users opens the app over 25 times per month.

In March 2015, We Heart It introduced a new postcard feature allowing its 30 million registered users to message one another with images.

The Huffington Post cited We Heart It as one of the "10 Happiest Places On The Internet" for finding a smile or inspiration on.

We Heart It was chosen as one of Google Play's Best Apps of 2013. and Best Apps of 2015.

References

External links
 

Android (operating system) software
Companies based in San Francisco
Software companies established in 2011
Social media companies of the United States
Internet properties established in 2008
IOS software
Mobile social software
Multilingual websites
Imageboards
American photography websites
American companies established in 2011